Dolenji Podboršt pri Trebnjem is a small settlement on the right bank of the Temenica River southeast of Trebnje in eastern Slovenia. The area is part of the historical Lower Carniola region. The Municipality of Trebnje is now included in the Southeast Slovenia Statistical Region.

Name
The name of the settlement was changed from Dolenji Podboršt  to Dolenji Podboršt pri Trebnjem in 1953.

References

External links
Dolenji Podboršt pri Trebnjem at Geopedia

Populated places in the Municipality of Trebnje